Old & In the Gray is a bluegrass album released in 2002 by the surviving members of the band Old & In the Way – Peter Rowan (guitar), David Grisman (mandolin), and Vassar Clements (fiddle). Banjoist Jerry Garcia and bassist John Kahn, both of whom were deceased, were replaced by Herb Pedersen and Bryn Bright, respectively.

Critical reception 

On AllMusic, Ken Dryden said, "The music stretches boundaries as much as the earlier band, with a mix of vintage bluegrass and country classics... along with more modern pieces... It's obvious that the musicians had a lot of fun trading vocals and instrumental licks as well as harmonizing throughout the date..."

In The Music Box, John Metzger wrote, "Renamed Old & In the Gray, the group at long last has recorded a studio album, and the result is well worth the wait. Of the fourteen tracks on its self-titled debut, there's nary a dud in the lot as the ensemble traverses a variety of songs, cutting a wide swath through bluegrass, country, and rock... Throughout the album, tight harmonies and exquisite instrumentation abound, all of which is put forth with genuine aplomb."

Track listing 

 "Good Old Boys" (John Hartford) – 4:57
 "Pancho and Lefty" (Townes Van Zandt) – 5:14
 "Meadow Green" (Peter Rowan) – 2:49
 "The Flood" (Carter Stanley) – 4:06
 "When the Springtime Comes Again" (A. P. Carter) – 3:14
 "Barefoot Nellie" (Don Reno, Jim Davis) – 2:28
 "Childish Love" (Ira Louvin) – 3:21
 "Victim to the Tomb" (John Duffey) – 4:28
 "Vassar's Fiddle Rag" (Vassar Clements) – 3:10
 "Two Little Boys" (Charlie Waller, John Duffey) – 3:57
 "On the Old Kentucky Shore" (Bill Monroe) – 4:17
 "Honky Tonk Women" (Keith Richards, Mick Jagger) – 2:35
 "Let Those Brown Eyes Smile at Me" (Rusty Nail) – 2:35
 "Rainmaker" (Peter Rowan) – 3:56

Personnel
Musicians
 David Grisman – mandolin, vocals
 Peter Rowan – guitar, vocals
 Herb Pedersen – banjo, guitar, vocals
 Vassar Clements – fiddle
 Bryn Bright – double bass
Production
 Produced by David Grisman
 Executive producer: Craig Miller
 Production assistance: Rob Bleetstein
 Recording engineer: Larry Cummings
 Mixing: Larry Cummings, David Grisman
 Mastering: Paul Stubblebine
 Cover art: Ivan Artucovich

Chart performance

References

Acoustic Disc albums
David Grisman albums
Old & In the Way albums
2002 albums